Rachel Yehuda (born 1959) is a professor of psychiatry and neuroscience, the Vice Chair for Veterans Affairs in the Psychiatry Department, and the Director of the Traumatic Stress Studies Division at the Mount Sinai School of Medicine. She also leads the PTSD clinical research program at the Neurochemistry and Neuroendocrinology laboratory at the James J. Peters VA Medical Center. In 2020 she became director of the Center for Psychedelic Psychotherapy and Trauma Research at Mount Sinai.

Biography 

She received her Ph.D. in Psychology and Neurochemistry and her M.S. in Biological Psychology from the University of Massachusetts at Amherst and completed her postdoctoral training in Biological Psychiatry in the Psychiatry Department at Yale Medical School. In 2019, she was elected to the National Academy of Medicine.

She has authored more than 500 published papers, chapters, and books in the field of traumatic stress and the neurobiology of post-traumatic stress disorder (PTSD).  Her interests include the study of risk and resilience factors, psychological and biological predictors of treatment response in PTSD, genetic and epigenetic studies of PTSD and the intergenerational transmission of trauma and PTSD. Her most cited article is a review of Post-traumatic stress disorder published in The New England Journal of Medicine, which has received more than 1600 citations according to Google Scholar.

She has an active federally funded clinical and research program that welcomes local and international students and clinicians. Her research has focused on PTSD in combat veterans, the children of Holocaust survivors and the children of pregnant women who survived the 9/11 attacks. Her work on diagnostic blood biomarkers for PTSD has yielded a patent approved in the US (9,243,293) and Europe (2334816) for diagnosis and treatment stratification for PTSD.

Publications

Author 
 The Art of Jewish Pastoral Counseling: A Guide for All Faiths with Michelle Friedman, published November 17, 2016 by Routledge
  (archive)

Contributor 

 The Psychobiology of Trauma and Resilience Across the Lifespan, published September 5, 2008 by Jason Aronson, Inc.

Editor 

 Psychological Trauma, published August 1, 1998 by American Psychiatric Association Publishing 
 Risk Factors for Posttraumatic Stress Disorder, published April 1, 1999 by American Psychiatric Association Publishing 
 Psychobiology of Posttraumatic Stress Disorder, published June 16, 2000 by New York Academy of Sciences  
 Treating Trauma Survivors with PTSD, published May 2, 2002 by American Psychiatric Association Publishing  
 International Handbook of Human Response to Trauma, initially published in 2000, republished November 11, 2013 by Springer US

References

External links
 
 Profile at the Icahn School of Medicine at Mount Sinai

1959 births
Living people
American biochemists
American geneticists
American neuroscientists
Jewish geneticists
Jewish neuroscientists
Psychedelic drug researchers
University of Massachusetts Amherst College of Natural Sciences alumni
Jewish women scientists
21st-century American women
Members of the National Academy of Medicine